The 1986 Virginia Slims of Dallas was a women's tennis tournament played on indoor carpet courts at the Moody Coliseum in Dallas, Texas in the United States and was part of the Category 4 tier of the 1985 Virginia Slims World Championship Series. It was the 17th edition of the tournament and ran from March 10 through March 16, 1986. First-seeded Martina Navratilova won the singles title.

Finals

Singles
 Martina Navratilova defeated  Chris Evert-Lloyd 6–2, 6–1
 It was Navratilova's 4th singles title of the year and the 115th of her career.

Doubles
 Claudia Kohde-Kilsch /  Helena Suková defeated  Hana Mandlíková /  Wendy Turnbull 4–6, 7–5, 6–4

See also
 Evert–Navratilova rivalry

References

External links
 ITF tournament edition details
 Tournament draws

Virginia Slims of Dallas
Virginia Slims of Dallas
Virginia
Virginia
Virginia Slims of Dallas
Virginia Slims of Dallas